Lago di Caprolace is a lake in the Province of Latina, Lazio, Italy. At an elevation of 1 m, its surface area is 2.3 km2.

References

Lakes of Lazio
Ramsar sites in Italy